The London Borough of Croydon is one of the boroughs in London with the most schools. They include primary schools (95), secondary schools (21) and four further education establishments. Croydon College has its main building in Croydon, it is a low rise building. John Ruskin College is one of the other colleges in the borough, located in Addington and Coulsdon College in Coulsdon. South Norwood has been the home of Spurgeon's College, a world-famous Baptist theological college, since 1923; Spurgeon's is located on South Norwood Hill and currently has some 1000 students. Winterbourne Junior Boys' and Winterbourne Junior Girls Schools are the only single-sex state primary schools in the United Kingdom. The London Borough of Croydon is the local education authority for the borough. Croydon operates a comprehensive system of education but there are a number of formerly selective schools in the borough; including The John Fisher School and Coloma Convent Girls' School

State-funded schools

Primary schools

Aerodrome Primary Academy, Waddon
All Saints CE Primary School, Upper Norwood
Applegarth Academy, New Addington
Ark Oval Primary Academy, Addiscombe
Atwood Primary Academy, Sanderstead
Beaumont Primary School, Purley
Beulah Infants' School, Thornton Heath
Beulah Junior School, Thornton Heath
Broadmead Primary School, Croydon
Castle Hill Academy, New Addington
Chestnut Park Primary School, Croydon
Chipstead Valley Primary School, Coulsdon
Christ Church CE Primary School, Purley
Coulsdon CE Primary School, Coulsdon
Courtwood Primary School, Croydon
The Crescent Primary School Selhurst
Cypress Primary School, South Norwood
David Livingstone Academy, Thornton Heath
Davidson Primary Academy, Croydon
Downsview Primary and Nursery School, Upper Norwood
Ecclesbourne Primary School, Thornton Heath
Elmwood Infant School, Croydon
Elmwood Junior School, Croydon
Fairchildes Primary School, New Addington
Forest Academy, Shirley
Forestdale Primary School, Croydon
Gilbert Scott Primary School, South Croydon
Gonville Academy, Thornton Heath
Good Shepherd RC Primary School, New Addington
Greenvale Primary School, South Croydon
Gresham Primary School, Sanderstead
Harris Primary Academy Benson, Shirley
Harris Primary Academy Croydon, Croydon
Harris Primary Academy Haling Park, South Croydon
Harris Primary Academy Kenley, Kenley
Harris Primary Academy Purley Way, Waddon
The Hayes Primary School, Kenley
Heathfield Academy, South Croydon
Heavers Farm Primary School, South Norwood
Howard Primary School, Croydon
Kenley Primary School, Whyteleafe
Kensington Avenue Primary School, Thornton Heath
Keston Primary School, Coulsdon
Krishna Avanti Primary School, Croydon
Margaret Roper RC Primary School, Purley
The Minster Junior School, Croydon
The Minster Nursery and Infant School, Croydon
Monks Orchard Primary School, Croydon
New Valley Primary School, Purley
Norbury Manor Primary School, Croydon
Oasis Academy Byron, Coulsdon
Oasis Academy Ryelands, South Norwood
Oasis Academy Shirley Park, Ashburton
Orchard Way Primary School, Croydon
The Minster Junior School, Croydon
The Minster Nursery and Infant School, Croydon
Park Hill Infant School, Croydon
Park Hill Junior School, Croydon
Paxton Academy, Thornton Heath
Purley Oaks Primary School, South Croydon
Regina Coeli RC Primary School, South Croydon
Ridgeway Primary School, South Croydon
Robert Fitzroy Academy, Croydon
Rockmount Primary School, Upper Norwood
Rowdown Primary School, New Addington
St Aidan's RC Primary School, Coulsdon
St Chad's RC Primary School, Selhurst
St Cyprian's Greek Orthodox Primary Academy, Thornton Heath
St James The Great RC Primary and Nursery School, Thornton Heath
St John's CE Primary School, Shirley
St Joseph's RC Infant School, Upper Norwood
St Joseph's RC Junior School, Upper Norwood
St Mark's CE Primary Academy, South Norwood
St Mary's RC Infant School, Croydon
St Mary's RC Junior School, Croydon
St Peter's Primary School, South Croydon
St Thomas Becket RC Primary School, Woodside
Selsdon Primary and Nursery School, South Croydon
Smitham Primary School, Coulsdon
South Norwood Primary School, South Norwood
Tudor Academy, New Addington
West Thornton Primary School, Croydon
Whitehorse Manor Infant School, Thornton Heath
Whitehorse Manor Junior School, Thornton Heath
Winterbourne Boys' Academy, Thornton Heath
Winterbourne Junior Girls' School, Thornton Heath
Winterbourne Nursery and Infants' School, Thornton Heath
Woodcote Primary School, Coulsdon
Woodside Primary School, Woodside

Secondary schools
Source

The Archbishop Lanfranc Academy, Thornton Heath
Archbishop Tenison's School
Ark Blake Academy, Croydon
BRIT School, Selhurst
Coloma Convent Girls' School, Shirley
Coombe Wood School, Croydon
Harris Academy Purley, Purley
Harris Academy South Norwood, South Norwood
Harris City Academy Crystal Palace, South Norwood
Harris Invictus Academy Croydon, Croydon
The John Fisher School, Purley*
Meridian High School, New Addington
Norbury High School for Girls, Thornton Heath
Oasis Academy Arena, South Norwood
Oasis Academy Coulsdon, Coulsdon
Oasis Academy Shirley Park, Ashburton
Orchard Park High School, Shirley
The Quest Academy, South Croydon
Riddlesdown Collegiate, Purley
St Joseph's College, Upper Norwood
St Mary's RC High School, Croydon
Shirley High School, Shirley
Thomas More RC School, Purley
Woodcote High School, Coulsdon

*This school is located in Croydon, but is administered by Sutton

Special and alternative schools 
Source

Addington Valley Academy, New Addington
Beckmead College, Monks Orchard
Beckmead Park Academy, Beckenham*
Bensham Manor School, Thornton Heath
Chaffinch Brook School, Croydon
Harris Aspire Academy, South Norwood
Priory School, South Norwood
Red Gates School, Purley Way
St Giles School, South Croydon
St Nicholas School, Purley
Saffron Valley Collegiate, Croydon

*This school is located in Bromley, but is for pupils from Croydon

Further education 
Coulsdon Sixth Form College, Old Coulsdon
Croydon College, Croydon
John Ruskin College, Addington

Independent schools

Primary and preparatory schools 
Cumnor House School, South Croydon
Elmhurst School for Boys, South Croydon
Laleham Lea School, Purley
Oakwood School, Purley
St David's School, Purley

Senior and all-through schools 

Al-Khair School, East Croydon
Cambridge Tutors College, South Croydon
The Cedars School, Upper Norwood
Croydon High School, Selsdon
Croydon Metropolitan College, Croydon
The Laurels School, Upper Norwood
The New School, Upper Norwood
Old Palace School of John Whitgift, Croydon
OneSchool Global UK, Kenley
Royal Russell School, Croydon
Trinity School of John Whitgift, Shirley
Whitgift School, South Croydon

Special and alternative schools 
AYA College, Selhurst
CACFO Education Centre, Thornton Heath
Cressey College, Croydon
Rutherford School, South Croydon
Serenity School, Croydon
The Write Time, Croydon

References

External links
London Borough of Croydon Council - Education and learning

 
Croydon